The CONCACAF Gold Cup is North America's major tournament in senior men's soccer and determines the continental champion. Until 1989, the tournament was known as CONCACAF Championship. It is currently held every two years. From 1996 to 2005, nations from other confederations have regularly joined the tournament as invitees. In earlier editions, the continental championship was held in different countries, but since the inception of the Gold Cup in 1991, the United States are constant hosts or co-hosts.

From 1973 to 1989, the tournament doubled as the confederation's World Cup qualification. CONCACAF's representative team at the FIFA Confederations Cup was decided by a play-off between the winners of the last two tournament editions in 2015 via the CONCACAF Cup, but was then discontinued along with the Confederations Cup. 

On 19 November 2019, Suriname qualified for the 2021 Gold Cup with 2–1 CONCACAF Nations League win over Nicaragua. It will be their debut in the CONCACAF Gold Cup and their first appearance in a CONCACAF tournament since 1985.

In the 2021 CONCACAF Gold Cup, Suriname will play against Costa Rica, Jamaica and the winner of the preliminary match 8 in Group C.

Record at the CONCACAF Championship/Gold Cup

Match Overview

Record by Opponent

References

External links
RSSSF archives and results
Soccerway database

Countries at the CONCACAF Gold Cup
CONCACAF Golf Cup